Patersonia occidentalis, commonly known as purple flag, or long purple-flag, is a species of flowering plant in the family Iridaceae and is endemic to southern Australia. It is a tufted, rhizome-forming perennial with narrow, sharply-pointed, strap-like leaves, egg-shaped, bluish violet sepals and a cylindrical capsule.

Description
Flowering mainly occurs from September to December, each flower open for one day, but each stem producing many flowers.

Taxonomy
Patersonia occidentalis was first formally described by the botanist Robert Brown in 1810 in his book Prodromus Florae Novae Hollandiae. The specific epithet (occidentalis) means "western", referring to the distribution of this species compared to others in the genus Patersonia.

The names of three varieties of P. occidentalis are accepted by the Australian Plant Census:
 Petersonia occidentalis var. angustifolia Benth. grows in winter-wet areas, swamps and along river banks in the Jarrah Forest, Swan Coastal Plain and Warren biogeographic regions of western Australia;
 Petersonia occidentalis var. latifolia Benth. grows in upland flats, slopes and valleys in the Avon Wheatbelt, Esperance Plains, Geraldton Sandplains, Jarrah Forest, Swan Coastal Plain and Warren biogeographic regions of Western Australia;
 Petersonia occidentalis R.Br. var. occidentalis is the most widely distributed variety, occurring in Western Australia, South Australia, Victoria and Tasmania.

Distribution and habitat
Purple flag occurs in Western Australia, South Australia, Victoria and Tasmania. In Western Australia it grows in winter-wet areas, on sand dunes and around granite outcrops and is widespread and common between the Murchison River in the north and Israelite Bay in the south. In South Australia P. occidentalis grows in heath and in clearings, usually in poorly-drained sites and is only found in the south-east of the state. In Victoria the species is widespread in near-coastal areas on poorly-drained sites and in Tasmania it forms clumps in swampy places in the north and east of the state.

Use in horticulture
Cultivated in gardens the species is frost tolerant and able to cope in a dry position.

References

occidentalis
Eudicots of Western Australia
Flora of South Australia
Flora of Victoria (Australia)
Flora of Tasmania
Asparagales of Australia
Plants described in 1810
Taxa named by Robert Brown (botanist, born 1773)